Fabulous Disaster was an American punk rock all-female band founded in 1998 in San Francisco, California.

History 
Fabulous Disaster formed in San Francisco in 1998 and released their debut album, Pretty Killers (Evil Eye Records, 1999). In 2000, they signed to Fat Wreck Chords', Pink and Black imprint. They toured heavily to promote their second album, Put Out or Get Out. They released Panty Raid!, in 2003 and toured with bands such as NOFX, The Mad Caddies, The Briefs, The Real McKenzies, The Dickies and others. While on the Fat Wreck Tour of 2001, they won the SF Weekly Best Punk Band award. They released the EP, I'm a Mess, in 2004, featuring a new lineup. More touring followed. They released a few split EP's with Euro bands like OC Toons and Zinc. The band's fourth full-length album, Love At First Fight, was released in May 2007. In the latter part of 2007, the band split up.

Discography 
Pretty Killers (1999)
Put Out or Get Out (2001)
Panty Raid (2003)
Im a Mess EP (2004)
Awesome Fromage - Split CD With OC Toons (2006)
Love at First Fight (2007)

Members 
Lynda Mandolyn - lead vocals
Sally Disaster - drums
Squeaky - guitar and vocals
Lizzie Boredom - bass
Laura Litter - Lead Vocalist  - Original Line Up
Mister Nancy - Bass - Original Line Up

Touring members 
Theo Logian - Bass
Mattowar  - bass

References

External links 
Official Fabulous Disaster Website
Fabulous Disaster on MySpace

All-female punk bands
Musical groups established in 1998
Musical groups disestablished in 2007
Punk rock groups from California
Fat Wreck Chords artists
Musical quartets
Pop punk groups from California